Chris Hixson (born December 4, 1974) is a former American football quarterback who played three seasons in the Arena Football League (AFL) with the Arizona Rattlers and Georgia Force. He played college football at the University of Rhode Island. He was also a member of the Tallahassee Thunder of the af2.

College career
Hixson played for the Rhode Island Rams from 1993 to 1996.

Professional career

Tallahassee Thunder 
Hixson was a member of the Tallahassee Thunder of the af2 in 2001.

Arizona Rattlers 
Hixson  was signed by the AFL's Arizona Rattlers March 18, 2002.

Georgia Force 
Hixson  played for the Georgia Force of the AFL in 2004. Hixson was released by the Force on October 15, 2004.

Arizona Rattlers (second stint) 
Hixson  signed with the Arizona Rattlers on February 1, 2005. He was released by the Rattlers on February 8, 2005.

AFL statistics

Stats from ArenaFan:

References

External links
Just Sports Stats

Living people
1974 births
Players of American football from Washington (state)
American football quarterbacks
Rhode Island Rams football players
Tallahassee Thunder players
Arizona Rattlers players
Georgia Force players